Lembang is a town and administrative village of West Bandung Regency in the province of West Java on Java, Indonesia. The town has about 17,000 inhabitants (at census 2010). The population of the Lembang District was 173,350 at the 2010 Census.

Lembang is situated between 1,312 and 2,084 meters above sea level. Its highest point is on top of Tangkuban Perahu Mt. The temperature usually ranges between 17 and 24 degrees Celsius.

Lembang means "dent" in Sundanese. Super Wheel Championship

Economy
Besides the tourism industry and agriculture, Lembang also has 69,000 dairy cow farmers which supply Frisian Flag, Diamond and Danone.

Education and military
Lembang has more than a dozen government centers of education and research and military bases.

Lembang Fault
The Lembang Fault is an active geological fault with a slip rate of 2 millimeters per year that crosses Lembang city and runs 22 kilometers north of the Bandung basin, ranging from Mount Palasari to Cisarua. 700 years ago, earthquakes occurred at several points along the fault line and could potentially trigger up to a magnitude-7 quake. This potential quake could impact 8 million people who are currently living in the Bandung basin area and its surrounding area.

References

Populated places in West Java
West Bandung Regency